Pearson Yachts was a sailboat manufacturer founded by Everett Pearson and Clinton Pearson in 1956. One of the first fiberglass sailboat manufacturers, they grew rapidly during the 60s and 70s, while also developing and designing new boats. However, the company changed ownership throughout the 1980s, after which the company filed for bankruptcy, and was eventually sold to Grumman Allied Industries in 1991. The rights to the name are now held by the Pearson Marine Group.

History

Founding
In 1955, cousins Clinton and Everett Pearson began building fiberglass dinghies in their garage on County Street in Seekonk, Massachusetts. The fiberglass material and their methods of construction was brand new and untested. However, Tom Potter from American Boat Building approached the Pearsons with a project to build an auxiliary sailboat that would sell for under $10,000. Naval architect Carl Alberg was given the task of designing the boat. The result was the Triton 28 sailing auxiliary. The first boat was built in the cousins' garage, in time for the 1959 New York Boat Show.

Going public
In 1959, the Triton 28 was launched at the New York Boat Show. The cousins had to borrow money to pay for the transport of the boat from their garage to the show. The boat proved to be a hit, and the cousins had deposits for 17 orders by the end of the show. To raise the capital to acquire facilities to meet the demand, the cousins made Pearson Yachts public in April 1959. Upon returning to Rhode Island, the cousins purchased the old Herreshoff Yard as an additional production site. Pearson Yachts introduced a number of new models, most of which were also designed by Carl Alberg. By the end of the year, the newly founded Pearson Yachts had over one hundred employees and was turning out nearly one boat per day. This rapid corporate expansion led to cash flow problems. They attempted to get approval for an additional stock offering to raise much needed capital, but were unsuccessful.

Grumman takeover (1961–1991)
In 1961, Grumman Allied Industries purchased a controlling interest in Pearson Yachts. The Pearson cousins left the company in the 1960s, and Bill Shaw became the chief designer. One of Shaw's most notable designs is the flush decked Pearson 40, introduced in 1977.

Pearson filed for bankruptcy in 1991. At that time TPI Composites, formerly known as Tillotson-Pearson, purchased the rights to the Pearson Yachts brand name.

Pearson models

Tillotson Pearson models
Alerion Express 19
Freedom 21
Freedom 25
Freedom 28
Freedom 28 Cat Ketch
Freedom 30 Gary Mull designed
Herreshoff Eagle
J/32
J/35
J/92
Navy 44 (M&R)

See also
Carl Alberg
Bristol Yachts

References

Pearson Yachts